Beate Koch (born 18 August 1967) is a retired German track and field athlete who competed in the javelin throw. She represented East Germany at the 1988 Summer Olympics held in Seoul, South Korea, where she won the bronze medal.

International competitions

References

1967 births
Living people
Sportspeople from Jena
People from Bezirk Gera
East German female javelin throwers
Olympic athletes of East Germany
Athletes (track and field) at the 1988 Summer Olympics
Olympic bronze medalists for East Germany
Medalists at the 1988 Summer Olympics
Olympic bronze medalists in athletics (track and field)
Recipients of the Patriotic Order of Merit in bronze